Koo Sze-yiu (born 1949), also known by his nickname "Long Beard", is a Hong Kong activist, known for being jailed for 12 times over his protests. A former Maoist, Koo became anti-communist after the 1989 Tiananmen Square massacre.

Early life 

Koo worked as an apprentice in a Macanese shipyard when young. He claimed to be a Maoist in his early years, joining the leftists to storm the Macau Government office, then a Portuguese colony, and clashed with the police in 12-3 incident in 1966. He was a core member of Macao Federation of Trade Unions, but fled to Hong Kong after what he described as "betrayal" by colleagues. Koo turned against the Chinese Communist Party after 1989 Tiananmen Square Crackdown on student activists demanding democracy in China, and urged for ending the one-party dictatorship.

Activism 

After 1989, Koo became committed to Hong Kong's social movements, showing up in different protests, including 1 July marches, and continued after the handover of Hong Kong in 1997. Koo was always seen to protest with Leung Kwok-hung, an ex-MP and also a left-wing activist, and best known for carrying a handmade coffin to protests to show his disapproval of Beijing.

As part of the Baodiao movement, he landed on the Senkaku Islands, or Diaoyutai Islands, on 15 August 2012. During a televised press conference in Hong Kong two days later, Koo swore at a man behind him, telling him to "move over, diu nei lo mo", which surprised audiences and became a local meme.

Koo revealed having diagnosed with end-stage colorectal cancer before the march on 1 July 2020. Koo said he disagreed with violent clashes and Hong Kong independence movement, but admitted only radical acts could be effective as both Chinese and Hong Kong Governments no longer tolerate peaceful protests. Koo also called on youngsters not to give up even though jailed for marches and assemblies, saying the authorities should take the blame.

Convictions and jail 

In 1998, Koo, along with Tsang Kin-shing, Leung Kwok-hung, and Lau Shan-ching, was fined $3,000 for disorder in public spaces over burning mock coffins during the visit by Jiang Zemin, paramount leader of China.

In 2000, Koo was jailed 14 days over two protests during Legislative Council proceedings.

In December 2008, Koo was accused of attacking guards of Legislative Council during protests against public offering of Link REIT, a real estate investment trust, and was jailed for 7 days after choosing not to pay the $2,000 fine.

On 18 February 2013, Koo was jailed for 9 months for desecrating the national and Hong Kong flags in protest at human rights abuses in China and the alleged murder of Li Wangyang. The jail term was reduced to 4.5 months on appeal. The same April, he was given a 4-month suspended sentence, reduced to 2 months on appeal, over attempt to burn the national flag at the Liaison Office.

In 2016, Koo was sentenced to 6 weeks’ imprisonment for having burnt the Hong Kong flag during the annual July 1 march in 2015. He celebrated his fifth jail sentence near the court.

On 27 March 2018, Koo was jailed for the sixth time, after desecrating the Chinese and Hong Kong flags during a candle light vigil in memory of Nobel Peace Prize winner Liu Xiaobo in 2017, and during the Chinese National Day protest in 2017, and New Year march in 2018. He was sent to 2 months in jail before chanting "all hail democracy", "all hail human rights" and "say no to the Chinese Community Party".

On 25 June 2019, Koo was jailed for 6 weeks after desecrating the Hong Kong flag by writing "Shameful Hong Kong Government" in protest against disqualifying Lau Siu-lai's MP seat, amounting to his seventh jail sentence.

On 28 January 2021, Koo received his tenth jail sentence of 4 months after desecrating the Chinese flag by writing "white terror" and "fascist horror" and flying it upside down, to voice out support with 15 democrats charged with illegal assembly. He vowed in court to breach the National Security Law imposed by China.

On 14 April 2021, just days after finishing his earlier jail term, Koo was jailed for 5 months over illegal assemblies with Joshua Wong on 5 October 2019, the day Prohibition on Face Covering Regulation was enacted.

Koo was again arrested on 4 February 2022, reportedly under the security law for suspected incitement of subversion, before his planned demonstration outside the Hong Kong Liaison Office to protest China's Winter Olympics and call attention to political activists behind bars. Facing charge of attempting to commit a seditious act over a one-metre long coffin and a white flag with language including "down with the Chinese Communist Party" and "end one-party rule" found at his home, Koo was denied bail. Koo was jailed for 9 months after the judge found him guilty.

See also 
Hong Kong 1 July marches

Family 

Koo's wife and daughter lived in mainland China, and visited Koo in 2012.

References 

1949 births
Living people
Hong Kong democracy activists
People convicted under the Hong Kong national security law
Prisoners and detainees of Hong Kong
Hong Kong political prisoners